The Backyard is a video game created by Broderbund in 1993 for MS-DOS and Macintosh. It is a sequel to its predecessor The Playroom and the third game of the "Early Learning Family" series. It was designed for ages 3 to 6 (preschool through first grade).

Gameplay
The Backyard contains six games including "Scarecrow Faces", "Pumpkin Patch", "Sandbox Treasure", "Animal Habitat", "Knothole" and "Animal Cookies" as well as other minor activities to teach players about creativity, map reading, numbers and animals. The game introduces Pepper Mouse's sister Ginger. She also appears in the 1995 remake of The Playroom.

References

External links

1993 video games
Broderbund games
Children's educational video games
DOS games
Classic Mac OS games
North America-exclusive video games
Video games about toys
Video games about mice and rats
Video games developed in the United States